The 2018–19 Gibraltar Second Division was the sixth season of the second tier football in Gibraltar since the Gibraltar Football Association joined UEFA. The season began on 15 August 2018. After the expulsion of Angels the previous season and withdrawal of Cannons, the league was contested by 7 clubs.

This season saw the return of the Second Division Cup after stadium renovations saw the tournament scrapped the previous year. The tournament took place during a mid-season break from 17 December 2018 until 9 March 2019. Boca Gibraltar were the reigning champions, earning promotion to the 2018–19 Gibraltar Premier Division.

There was no promotion after the completion of this season due to the merger of Gibraltar's football leagues to form the new Gibraltar National League.

Format
Clubs played each other three times for a total of 18 matches each, with a break in mid-season for clubs to contest the Chesterton's Cup.

This season saw an expansion of the Home Grown Player (HPG) rule, which required clubs to name a minimum of 4 home grown players in their matchday squads with at least three of them on the field of play at all times.

Teams

Boca Gibraltar were promoted to the 2018–19 Gibraltar Premier Division as champions last season. FC Olympique 13 lost their promotion playoff, so remained in the division. Manchester 62 were relegated to the Second Division after finishing bottom of the 2017–18 Gibraltar Premier Division. Cannons folded and withdrew from the league after the end of the season, while Angels were not re-admitted following their expulsion, leaving the Second Division with just seven teams.

Managerial changes

League table

Results

Matches 1–12

Matches 13–18

Season statistics
As of 25 May 2019.

Top scorers 

1 Robert Montovio scored 4 goals for Europa Point before transferring to Manchester 62.

Hat-tricks

Clean sheets 

1 Juan Carlos Bedmar kept 2 clean sheets for Leo before transferring to Manchester 62.

End-of-season awards
End of season awards were handed out by Football Gibraltar, the Gibraltar Football Association's official UEFA correspondents, on 2 June.

See also
2018–19 Gibraltar Premier Division
2018–19 Gibraltar Intermediate League

References

External links
Gibraltar Football Association

Gibraltar Second Division seasons
Gib
2